Fanfare is an American bimonthly magazine devoted to reviewing recorded music in all playback formats. It mainly covers classical music, but since inception, has also featured a jazz column in every issue.

History and profile
Fanfare was founded on 1 September 1977 "as a labor of love" by an elementary-school teacher turned editor named Joel Bruce Flegler (born 1941).  After  years, he is still the publisher.

The magazine now runs to over 600 pages in a  format with about 80% of the editorial copy devoted to record reviews, and a front section with a substantial number of interviews and feature articles. It avoids equipment and pop music coverage, and includes reviews of more classical releases than most similar magazines. 

Subscriptions include online access to current content and archives of past issues.

References 
Notes

Sources
 Who's Who in U.S. Writers, Editors & Poets, A biographical directory, Second edition, edited by Curt Johnson, December Press, Highland Park, IL (1988) (search: Joel B. Fletcher) 
 Who's Who in Writers, Editors & Poets. United States & Canada, Third edition, 1989-1990, edited by Curt Johnson, December Press, Highland Park, IL (1989) (search: Joel B. Fletcher) 
 Who's Who in Writers, Editors & Poets. United States & Canada, Fourth edition, 1992-1993, edited by Curt Johnson, December Press, Highland Park, IL (search: Joel B. Fletcher) (1992)

External links
 Official website
 Cornell University Library reference
 

1977 establishments in New Jersey
Music magazines published in the United States
Bimonthly magazines published in the United States
Classical music magazines
Jazz magazines
Magazines established in 1977
Magazines published in New Jersey
Musicology